Elsa Maria Meireles Amaral (born 31 May 1966 in Porto) is a retired Portuguese middle-distance runner who competed primarily in the 800 metres. She represented her country at the 1992 Summer Olympics, as well as two outdoor and two indoor World Championships.

Competition record

Personal bests
Outdoor
400 metres – 53.59 (1991)
800 metres – 2:01.21 (Split 1990)
Indoor
800 metres – 2:02.51 (Sindelfingen 1993)
1000 metres – 2:47.11 (Moscow 1996)

References

1966 births
Living people
Sportspeople from Porto
Portuguese female middle-distance runners
Athletes (track and field) at the 1992 Summer Olympics
Olympic athletes of Portugal
World Athletics Championships athletes for Portugal